Kobilja may refer to:

In Bosnia and Herzegovina:
Kobilja (river), right tributary of Ugar
Kobilja, a settlement in Kneževo (formerly Skender Vakuf)
Kobilja Glava, a village near Vogošća Municipality, near Sarajevo

See also 
 Kobjeglava, a village in the Littoral region of Slovenia
 Kobilje (disambiguation)